The Olympus Zuiko Digital ED 50-200mm F2.8-3.5 SWD is an interchangeable lens for Four Thirds system digital single-lens reflex cameras announced by Olympus Corporation on October 17, 2007. It added an ultrasonic motor (which Olympus branded SWD, for Supersonic Wave Drive) to the existing optical formula of the Olympus Zuiko Digital ED 50-200mm F2.8-3.5 introduced in 2003; it is slightly larger and heavier than the earlier lens.

References
https://www.dpreview.com/products/olympus/lenses/oly_50-200_2p8-3p5_swd

External links
 

Camera lenses introduced in 2007
050-200mm 1:2.8-3.5 SWD